In mathematics, a finitely generated algebra (also called an algebra of finite type) is a commutative associative algebra A over a field K where there exists a finite set of elements a1,...,an of A such that every element of A can be expressed as a polynomial in a1,...,an, with coefficients in K.

Equivalently, there exist elements  s.t. the evaluation homomorphism at 

is surjective; thus, by applying the first isomorphism theorem, . 

Therefore, we obtain the following characterisation of finitely generated -algebras
 is a finitely generated -algebra if and only if it is isomorphic to a quotient ring of the type  by an ideal .

If it is necessary to emphasize the field K then the algebra is said to be finitely generated over K . Algebras that are not finitely generated are called infinitely generated.

Examples 

 The polynomial algebra K[x1,...,xn&hairsp;] is finitely generated. The polynomial algebra in countably infinitely many generators is infinitely generated. 
 The field E = K(t) of rational functions in one variable over an infinite field K is not a finitely generated algebra over K. On the other hand, E is generated over K by a single element, t, as a field.
 If E/F is a finite field extension then it follows from the definitions that E is a finitely generated algebra over F.
 Conversely, if E/F is a field extension and E is a finitely generated algebra over F then the field extension is finite. This is called Zariski's lemma. See also integral extension.
 If G is a finitely generated group then the group algebra KG is a finitely generated algebra over K.

Properties 

 A homomorphic image of a finitely generated algebra is itself finitely generated. However,  a similar property for subalgebras does not hold in general.
 Hilbert's basis theorem: if A is a finitely generated commutative algebra over a Noetherian ring then every ideal of A is finitely generated, or equivalently, A is a Noetherian ring.

Relation with affine varieties 
Finitely generated reduced commutative algebras are basic objects of consideration in modern algebraic geometry, where they correspond to affine algebraic varieties; for this reason, these algebras are also referred to as (commutative) affine algebras. More precisely, given an affine algebraic set  we can associate a finitely generated -algebra

then,  is a contravariant functor from the category of affine algebraic sets with regular maps to the category of reduced finitely generated -algebras: this functor turns out to be an equivalence of categories

and, restricting to affine varieties (i.e. irreducible affine algebraic sets),

Finite algebras vs algebras of finite type 

An -algebra  is finite if it is finitely generated as an -module, i.e. there is a surjective homomorphism of -modules

Again, there is a characterisation of finite algebras in terms of quotients
An -algebra  is finite if and only if it is isomorphic to a quotient  by an -submodule .

By definition, a finite -algebra is of finite type, but the converse is false: the polynomial ring  is of finite type but not finite.

Finite algebras and algebras of finite type are related to the notions of finite morphisms and morphisms of finite type.

References

See also 
 Finitely generated module
 Finitely generated field extension
 Artin–Tate lemma
 Finite algebra
 Morphism of finite type

Algebras
Commutative algebra